The first season of Packed to the Rafters, an Australian drama television series, began airing on 26 August 2008 on the Seven Network. The season concluded on 24 March 2009 after 22 episodes. The first season aired Tuesdays at 8:30 pm in Australia and averaged 1,904,364 viewers. The season was released on DVD as a six disc set under the title of Packed to the Rafters: The Complete Season 1 on 2 December 2009.

The first season begins as Julie and Dave Rafter are over the moon when their last remaining child finally leaves home. But what happens when the rest of the family suddenly returns to the nest? Less than 48 hours after their middle son Ben moves himself next door, all dreams of freedom are put on hold as one by one their youngest son Nathan and his princess wife Sammy, their troubled eldest daughter Rachel, and Julie's emotionally vulnerable father Ted all return to the family home. Plenty of drama, many laughs and a few tears ensue as the Rafters must learn to live under the same roof once again.

Cast

Regular
 Rebecca Gibney as Julie Rafter
 Erik Thomson as Dave Rafter
 Jessica Marais as Rachel Rafter
 Angus McLaren as Nathan Rafter
 Hugh Sheridan as Ben Rafter
 Jessica McNamee as Sammy Rafter
 Michael Caton as Ted Taylor

Recurring and guest
 George Houvardas as Nick "Carbo" Karandonis
 Zoe Ventoura as Melissa Bannon
 Caroline Brazier as Chrissy Merchant
 Justin Rosniak as Stuart "Warney" Warne
 Luke Pegler as Daniel Griggs
 Sarah Chadwick as Trish Westaway
 Jerome Ehlers as Anthony Westaway
 Kate Fitzpatrick as Marjorie Stevens
 George Spartels as Theo Karandonis
 Dina Panozzo as Rita Karandonis
 Roy Billing as Ron Barrett
 Belinda Bromilow as Libby Sanders
 Craig McLachlan as Steve Wilson
 Michael Booth as George Spiteri

Episodes

{| class="wikitable plainrowheaders" style="width:100%;"
|-style="color:white"
! style="background: #149bff;" | No. inseries
! style="background: #149bff;" | No. inseason
! style="background: #149bff;" | Title
! style="background: #149bff;" | Narrator
! style="background: #149bff;" | Directed by
! style="background: #149bff;" | Written by
! style="background: #149bff;" | Original air date
! style="background: #149bff;" | Australian Viewers(millions)
|-

|}

Reception

Ratings

1 Viewer numbers are based on preliminary OzTAM data for Sydney, Melbourne, Brisbane, Adelaide and Perth combined.

References

2008 Australian television seasons
2009 Australian television seasons